Dinner for One, also known as The 90th Birthday, is a two-hander comedy sketch, written by British author Lauri Wylie for the theatre. After featuring on the stage, the German TV broadcaster, Norddeutscher Rundfunk (NDR) recorded the sketch in 1962 as an 18-minute black-and-white videotape recording, performed by British comedians Freddie Frinton and May Warden.

It has become traditional viewing on New Year's Eve in European countries such as Germany, Austria, Switzerland, Denmark, Sweden, Norway, Finland and Estonia, or on 23 December in Norway, and, as of 1995, was the most frequently repeated television programme in Germany ever. Despite starting on the British stage, the sketch has only recently started to gain recognition in the UK. It was broadcast on New Year's Eve in Britain on Sky Arts from 2018 to 2020.

In other parts of the world, the sketch is broadcast in Australia and South Africa. Apart from a few satires, Dinner for One is not known in the United States, where the comic premise had already been made famous by Red Skelton and Lucille Ball. The article "Dinner for One: The greatest cult film you've never heard of", published in 2018, investigates the reason for its obscurity.

In 2003, Danish TV producer Paul Anthony Sørensen directed and produced a documentary about the sketch that includes interviews with relatives of Freddie Frinton and May Warden. It was nominated for the Rose d'Or 2004.

Plot
Heinz Piper introduces the story as the conferencier: Miss Sophie (Warden) is celebrating her 90th birthday. As every year, she has invited her four closest friends to a birthday dinner: Sir Toby, Admiral von Schneider, Mr. Pomeroy, and Mr. Winterbottom. However, she has outlived all of them, requiring her butler James (Frinton) to impersonate the guests.

James not only must serve Miss Sophie the four courses à la russe – mulligatawny soup, North Sea haddock, chicken and fruit – but also serve the four imaginary guests the drinks chosen by Miss Sophie (sherry, white wine, champagne and port wine for the respective courses), slip into the role of each guest and drink a toast to Miss Sophie. As a result, James becomes increasingly intoxicated and loses his dignified demeanour; he pours the drinks with reckless abandon, breaks into "Sugartime" by the McGuire Sisters for a brief moment, and at one point accidentally drinks from a flower vase, which he acknowledges with a grimace and exclaims "Oooh! I'll kill that cat!"

There are several running gags in the piece:
James frequently trips over the head of a tigerskin rug; as an additional punchline, he walks past it in one instance to his own astonishment, but then stumbles over it on the way back. In another instance, he gracefully steps over it, and in the final instance, the tipsy James leaps over the head.
Sir Toby would like to have poured a small extra amount of each drink, and James complies with the request with initial politeness and then increasing sarcasm.
Miss Sophie expects James, as Admiral von Schneider, to knock his heels together with the exclamation "Skål!" (Swedish for "Cheers!"). Because this action proves painful, he asks each time whether he really has to, but obliges upon Miss Sophie's insistence. The gag is broken as an additional punchline when the drunk James' feet miss each other, causing him to stumble.
Before each course, James asks and gradually babbles "The same procedure as last year, Miss Sophie?"; Miss Sophie replies "The same procedure as every year, James".

Finally, Miss Sophie concludes the evening with an inviting "I think I'll retire", to which James and Sophie repeat their exchange concerning the "same procedure". James takes a deep breath, turns to the audience with a sly grin and says "Well, I'll do my very best" before the pair retreat to the upper rooms.

Origin of the sketch
Lauri Wylie debuted Dinner for One as a sketch in his London stage revue En Ville Ce Soir in 1934.

Frinton and Warden performed Dinner for One on stage on Britain's seaside piers as early as 1945; Frinton inherited the rights to the sketch in 1951 after Wylie's death. The sketch was also staged elsewhere, for example in 1953 in John Murray Anderson's Almanac at the Imperial Theatre with Hermione Gingold playing Miss Sophie, Billy DeWolfe as the butler, and four dead friends.

In 1962, German entertainer Peter Frankenfeld and director Heinz Dunkhase discovered Dinner for One in Blackpool. The sketch was staged in Frankenfeld's live show soon afterwards, and recorded on 8 July 1963 at the Theater am Besenbinderhof, Hamburg, in front of a live audience. The sketch was recorded in English with a short introduction in German. The introductory theme, Charmaine, was composed by Lew Pollack and recorded by the Victor Silvester orchestra. According to the NDR, Frinton and Warden were each paid DM 4,150. The show was re-run occasionally until it gained its fixed spot on New Year's Eve in 1972.

The comic premise of the skit—a man consuming multiple rounds of alcohol and becoming comically drunk—is generally credited to American actor Red Skelton, who included a similar sketch as part of his vaudeville routines beginning in 1928 (and allowed the premise to be used by Lucille Ball in the famed I Love Lucy episode "Lucy Does a TV Commercial"). There is no definitive evidence of when Wylie wrote the sketch; the first evidence there is of the Dinner for One sketch being performed is from 1934, and as neither Skelton nor Wylie were internationally famous at the time, neither one likely knew of the other's work.

Broadcasting countries
The sketch has become a viewing tradition on New Year's Eve in German-speaking countries, where up to half the population may watch it every year on New Year's Eve. Some die-hard fans even copy the meal served in the sketch. The full 18-minute version is typically aired in Germany on Das Erste in the afternoon, and the regional third channels several times throughout the afternoon and evening. In Austria, ORF 1 airs the full sketch around 11:30 pm. Swiss public broadcaster SRF shows its own 11-minute version around 7:00 pm on SRF 1 and at 11:50 pm on SRF zwei.

It is also a New Year tradition in Scandinavian countries. In Finland, the show is viewed by 400,000 viewers each New Year's Eve.

In Sweden, the show was suspended for six years after its first screening, deemed unsuitable because of James's heavy drinking. However, the TV network finally capitulated to popular demand and brought it back. It has been broadcast every year since 1976 in Sweden, with the exception of 2004 in the wake of the 2004 Indian Ocean earthquake and tsunami.

In 1985, the Danish television network, DR, decided not to broadcast the sketch,  but received so many complaints that it returned the following year. With this single exception, Dinner for One has been shown on DR every 31 December since 1980.

In Norway, the show is broadcast on 23 December, also since 1980. In 1992, it was aired 15 minutes early, and the resulting audience uproar caused it to be re-broadcast later that night.

It is broadcast annually on New Year's Eve in Australia (since 1989) and South Africa, though it is not as well known as in Europe. It was shown briefly in the US (by HBO) in the 1970s.

The sketch is almost completely unknown in the United Kingdom, and its first national British television airing did not come until Sky Arts broadcast the film on New Year's Eve 2018 (although a year before, the film had been screened on Grimsby local channel Estuary TV). The Sky Arts broadcast included English subtitles for the German-language introduction, the end of which briefly faded out followed by a fade in on Frinton, cutting out the moment when the German announcer introduces James.

Although the sketch is most popular in European countries, it is usually shown in the original English without dubbing or subtitles. It is easy to understand with even a basic knowledge of English due to the physical nature of the comedy. British people are often perplexed by fans' ability to quote dialogue.

Different versions

The NDR television channel recorded several other versions in 1963.  Danish TV shows a version in which no audience is heard.

A third, 11-minute version was recorded by Schweizer Fernsehen (Swiss Television) with less alcohol drunk.

Both the 18-minute and 11-minute versions have been released on DVD in Germany.

In 1977, the Dutch public broadcasting system created a Dutch language version starring Joop Doderer, but this never achieved the same popularity.

In 1999, the NDR released a colourised version.

In Denmark, a parody of the sketch was filmed, subtitled "The 80th Birthday", in which Miss Sophie's friends are still at the table (though the NDR version mentions that the last of Miss Sophie's friends died 25 years ago). Other versions have been produced in different German dialects, including one in Low German (this version, "Dinner for One Up Platt," is also aired on NDR in rotation annually along with the original), various re-enactments or parodies by different comedians, and a version featuring the German glove puppet character Bernd das Brot ("Bernd the Bread") named "dinner for brot".
In 1992 a color version was filmed in the Frankfurt festival hall with Bodo Maria and Macha Stein. The resulting VHS cassette/DVD was dedicated to the Frankfurt UFA GmbH star Camilla Horn. Camilla Horn had originally been meant to play the role of Miss Sophie. However, she had to withdraw due to illness.

On 24 December 2011, a digitally-edited satirical version entitled "The 90th Euro rescue summit, or, Euros for No One", produced by Udo Eling and German state broadcaster ARD, was uploaded to YouTube. It features German Chancellor Angela Merkel as Miss Sophie and French President Nicolas Sarkozy as her servant and has new German (and some French) dialogue about the Eurozone debt crisis.

In 2016, Netflix made a parody in which the guests are replaced with characters from Netflix shows, specifically Saul Goodman from Breaking Bad and Better Call Saul, Frank Underwood from House of Cards, Pablo Escobar from Narcos, and Crazy Eyes from Orange is the New Black.

Catch phrase: "Same procedure as every year"
The line "Same procedure as every year" (in the original English) has become a very popular catchphrase in Germany. The phrase has entered everyday vocabulary, and is used in newspaper headlines and advertisements. This is also the case in Norway, Denmark and Sweden.

Legacy
The sketch resonated strongly with Norwegian, Luxembourgish and German audiences. The sketch is one of the most widely-known pieces of English-language media in Europe despite its relatively minimal impact in Britain.

Deutsche Post issued a commemorative stamp for the show on 11 October 2018.

In January 2021, Google added an easter egg to their Knowledge Panel for the film. The panel included a tiger's head, which when clicked showed James running across the screen and tripping over said tiger. It also featured sound clips from the film, chiefly the line "Same procedure as every year, James."

In December 2022, it was announced that German studio UFA would produce a six-part prequel series, set 50 years before the original version.

See also
 Dinner for One, 2008 debut album by Amity in Fame, an acoustic rock band from Linz, Austria
 From All of Us to All of You, 1958 Disney Christmas special that has become a tradition in Nordic countries.
 Tři oříšky pro Popelku, a holiday classic in several European countries.
 The Irony of Fate, or Enjoy your Banya!, a Soviet film traditionally broadcast in Russia and the former Soviet republics every New Year's Day.
 Trading Places, 1983 American comedy film, the movie has become a tradition on Italian television for its Christmas atmosphere, it is always broadcast in the evening of Christmas Eve.
 The Snowman, a half-hour animated adaptation of the book of the same name, which debuted on Channel 4 in the United Kingdom on 26 December 1982. It has since become a prominent annual festive event in British popular culture.

References

External links

Video
 English transcript (NDR)
Alternative versions
 
 

Articles
 The Mystery of Dinner for One
 British comedy lives on in German television
 Dinner for One: A sketch well-known to all but the British
 10 famous Britons you've probably never heard of: Freddie Frinton
 Dinner For One: How an obscure British skit became a New Year's Eve tradition

1963 films
1963 comedy films
1963 short films
1963 television films
German comedy short films
German television films
Comedy sketches
English-language German films
New Year's television specials
West German films
Winter traditions
Fictional servants
Two-handers
1960s German films
Das Erste original programming